Dana L. Murray (born January 18, 1946) is a former American Democrat politician who served in the Missouri House of Representatives.

Born in Harrisburg, Illinois, she graduated from Normandy High School in 1964.

References

1946 births
20th-century American politicians
21st-century American politicians
20th-century American women politicians
21st-century American women politicians
Democratic Party members of the Missouri House of Representatives
Living people
Women state legislators in Missouri